Felimare olgae is a species of very colourful sea slug or dorid nudibranch, a marine gastropod mollusk in the family Chromodorididae.

Distribution
This nudibranch is found in the Caribbean.

Description
Felimare olgae has a golden-brown body covered in blue and black spots. The mantle is pale yellow. The gills are pale yellow outlined with dark-blue and the rhinophores are pale-yellow, tipped with dark blue. This species can reach a total length of at least  and has been observed feeding on the blue sponge Dysidea etheria.

References

Chromodorididae
Gastropods described in 2007